Ravinder Baliala is an Indian politician from the Bharatiya Janata Party. He was previously a member of the Haryana Legislative Assembly from the Indian National Lok Dal representing Ratia (Vidhan Sabha constituency) of Fatehabad district, Haryana.

References

Members of the Haryana Legislative Assembly
Living people
Year of birth missing (living people)
Place of birth missing (living people)